Sodium/potassium/calcium exchanger 4 also known as solute carrier family 24 member 4 is a protein that in humans is encoded by the SLC24A4 gene.

Clinical effects
Mutations in SLC24A4 cause amelogenesis imperfecta.

References 

Human proteins
Solute carrier family